Fiorella Cueva (born 4 February 1998) is a Peruvian weightlifter. She competed in the women's 53 kg event at the 2016 Summer Olympics.

Major results

References

External links
 

1998 births
Living people
Peruvian female weightlifters
Olympic weightlifters of Peru
Weightlifters at the 2016 Summer Olympics
Place of birth missing (living people)
Weightlifters at the 2014 Summer Youth Olympics
Weightlifters at the 2019 Pan American Games
Pan American Games competitors for Peru
21st-century Peruvian women